Kkulppang, also known as honey bread, is a sticky, sweet bread filled with sweetened red bean paste. Softer, fluffier ones that are made in Tongyeong, South Gyeongsang Province in South Korea, are called Tongyeong-kkulppang, being a local specialty. In an adjacent city called Jinju, crunchier Jinju-kkulppang is sold as a local specialty. Shortly after the Korean War, many bakeries in Tongyeong were sold. Fishermen and shipbuilding workers who worked on the beach simply ate a meal or snack because they could be kept for a long time despite the warm climate of Tongyeong.

History 
Kkulppang was first made and sold in 1963 by Jeong Wonseok at a stand in front of his house in Hangnam-dong, Tongyeong. In the early 1960s, when post-war impoverishment was severe, the bread was made with rationed wheat flour.

Preparation 
Sifted wheat flour is kneaded with eggs to form dough. The dough is then rolled into small balls and filled with sweetened red bean paste, deep-fried in vegetable oil, and then coated with syrup and toasted sesame seeds.

Varieties 

Fillings for Tongyeong-kkulppang other than the typical red bean paste include sweet potato, chestnut, yuja and green tea.

Gallery

References 

South Korean breads
Sweet breads
Legume dishes
Stuffed desserts
Deep fried foods